An androgen-dependent condition, disease, disorder, or syndrome, is a medical condition that is, in part or full, dependent on, or is sensitive to, the presence of androgenic activity in the body.

Known androgen-dependent conditions include acne, seborrhea, androgenic alopecia, hirsutism, hidradenitis suppurativa, precocious puberty in boys, hypersexuality, paraphilias, benign prostatic hyperplasia (BPH), prostate cancer, and hyperandrogenism in women such as in polycystic ovary syndrome (PCOS), congenital adrenal hyperplasia (CAH), and androgen-secreting tumors (gonadal or adrenal tumor).

Such conditions may be treated with drugs with antiandrogen actions, including androgen receptor antagonists such as cyproterone acetate, spironolactone, and bicalutamide, 5α-reductase inhibitors such as finasteride and dutasteride, CYP17A1 inhibitors such as abiraterone acetate, gonadotropin-releasing hormone (GnRH) analogues such as leuprorelin and cetrorelix, and/or other antigonadotropins such as megestrol acetate and medroxyprogesterone acetate.

See also
 Androgen deprivation therapy
 Androgen insensitivity syndrome
 Estrogen-dependent condition
 Spinal bulbar muscular atrophy

References

Further reading
 

Endocrine gonad disorders
Male genital disorders
Mammal reproductive system
Testosterone